The Primetime Emmy Award for Outstanding Directing for a Documentary/Nonfiction Program is awarded to one program each year. The category was split in 2018 to separately recognize documentary/nonfiction and reality programs.

In the following list, the first titles listed in gold are the winners; those not in gold are nominees, which are listed in alphabetical order. The years given are those in which the ceremonies took place:



Winners and nominations

1970s

1980s

1990s

2000s

2010s

2020s

Individuals with multiple nominations

3 nominations
 Ken Burns
 Martin Scorsese
 Christopher Wilcha

2 nominations
 Judd Apatow
 Adam Beckman
 Alex Gibney
 Rory Kennedy
 Brett Morgen
 Lynn Novick

Notes

References

External links
 Academy of Television Arts and Sciences website

Directing for a Documentary/Nonfiction Program